St. Thomas University or University of St. Thomas may refer to:

Saint Thomas Aquinas University, Colombia
Saint Thomas Aquinas University of the North, Tucumán province, Argentina
St. Thomas University (Canada), Fredericton, New Brunswick
St. Thomas University, Japan
St. Thomas University (Florida), United States
St. Thomas University School of Law
Pontifical University of Saint Thomas Aquinas, Rome, Italy
Universidad Santo Tomás de Aquino, Dominican Republic
University of Santo Tomas, Manila, Philippines
University of St. Thomas (Minnesota), United States
University of St. Thomas (Texas), United States

See also
University of the Virgin Islands, Saint Thomas, U.S. Virgin Islands
International Council of Universities of Saint Thomas Aquinas